Isac Félix da Silva (Born June 8, 1985 in Fortaleza, Ceará, Brazil), or simply Isac, is a Brazilian professional football striker who currently plays for Remo.

Career
Born in Ceará, Isac played mainly for clubs from his home state in the first years of his career. In 2008, he was runner-up of Campeonato Cearense, Ceará's most important competition, playing for Icasa.

Isac joined Campeonato Brasileiro Série B club América (RN) in 2012. That became one of the best years of his career, since he ended the season in second place in the race for the golden boot, scoring 20 goals in 35 matches, 7 goals behind Criciúma's Zé Carlos. Some months later, in February 2013, both Isac and Zé Carlos transferred to Chinese Super League side Changchun Yatai.

Inter de Lages
In December 2015, Inter de Lages announced it had signed Isac. Playing for Inter de Lages in Campeonato Catarinense, Santa Catarina's state championship in 2016, he would eventually finish as the competition's third best scorer of that year.

Honours
América (RN)
Campeonato Potiguar: 2012
Campeonato Potiguar: 2014

Sampaio Corrêa (MA)
Campeonato Maranhense: 2017

References

1985 births
Living people
Sportspeople from Fortaleza
Brazilian footballers
Association football forwards
Campeonato Brasileiro Série A players
Campeonato Brasileiro Série B players
Chinese Super League players
Brazilian expatriate footballers
Expatriate footballers in China
Brazilian expatriate sportspeople in China
Esporte Clube Bahia players
Ceará Sporting Club players
Associação Desportiva Recreativa e Cultural Icasa players
América Futebol Clube (RN) players
Changchun Yatai F.C. players
Red Bull Brasil players 
Clube de Regatas Brasil players
Esporte Clube Internacional de Lages players
Sampaio Corrêa Futebol Clube players
Clube do Remo players
Horizonte Futebol Clube players